The following is a summary of the 2014–15 season of competitive football in Switzerland.

Men's national team
The home team is on the left column; the away team is on the right column.

UEFA Euro 2016 qualification

Friendly matches

Non-official Games

Women's national team
The home team is on the left column; the away team is on the right column.

World Cup 2015 qualifying

2015 FIFA Women's World Cup

2015 Algarve Cup

Friendly matches

League standings

Raiffeisen Super League

Brack.ch Challenge League

 
Seasons in Swiss football
2014 in Swiss sport
2015 in Swiss sport